Poretsky (masculine), Poretskaya (feminine), or Poretskoye (neuter) is the name of several rural localities in Russia:
Poretskoye, Chuvash Republic, a selo in Poretskoye Rural Settlement of Poretsky District in the Chuvash Republic
Poretskoye, Nizhny Novgorod Oblast, a village in Novomirsky Selsoviet of Vadsky District in Nizhny Novgorod Oblast
Poretskoye, Penza Oblast, a village in Tsarevshchinsky Selsoviet of Mokshansky District in Penza Oblast
Poretskoye, Ulyanovsk Oblast, a selo in Speshnevsky Rural Okrug of Kuzovatovsky District in Ulyanovsk Oblast
Poretskoye, Vladimir Oblast, a selo in Suzdalsky District of Vladimir Oblast